Acromyrmex hispidus is a species of leaf-cutter ant, a New World ant of the subfamily Myrmicinae of the genus Acromyrmex. It is found in the wild naturally in southern Brazil and Bolivia.

Subspecies
Acromyrmex hispidus fallax Santschi, 1925
Acromyrmex hispidus formosus Santschi, 1925
Acromyrmex hispidus hispidus Santschi, 1925

See also
List of leafcutter ants

References

Acromyrmex
Insects described in 1925
Hymenoptera of South America
Taxa named by Felix Santschi